Sadie is  a feminine given name which originated as an English diminutive of the Hebrew name Sarah. It has long been used as an independent name.

Popularity
It was among the top 100 names for girls in the late 1800s in the United States, then declined in use in the mid-twentieth century. It increased in popularity beginning in the mid-1980s and is popular across the English-speaking world. It has ranked among the top 200 names for newborn girls in England and Wales and among the top 100 names for girls in Ireland, Northern Ireland, Scotland, the United States, Canada, Australia, and New Zealand in the past decade.

Cultural references
Sadie Hawkins, a character in the Li'l Abner comic strip, was the inspiration for Sadie Hawkins Day, when traditional gender roles were flipped and young women asked men out on dates.

"Sexy Sadie" is a song from the Beatles' "White Album".

Notes 

Feminine given names